John "Johnny"/"Jack" James Grundy (27 August 1926 – 1978) was an English professional rugby league footballer who played as a  forward in the 1940s, 1950s and 1960s. 

He played at representative level for Great Britain and Lancashire, and at club level for United Glass Bottle ARLFC (now Eccleston Lions ARLFC  (in Eccleston, St Helens) of the North West Men's League), New Church Tavern ARLFC (in St Helens), St. Helens, Barrow and Roose ARLFC (in Roose, Barrow-in-Furness) during the era of contested scrums.

Background
Jack Grundy was born in Prescot, Lancashire, England. He served in the Royal Navy aboard . He died aged 51–52 in Barrow-in-Furness, Cumbria, England.

Playing career

International honours
Grundy won caps for Great Britain while at Barrow in 1955 against New Zealand (3 matches), in 1956 against Australia (3 matches). in 1957 against France (3 matches), and in the 1957 Rugby League World Cup against France, Australia, and New Zealand (1-try).

Grundy also represented Great Britain while at Barrow between 1952 and 1956 against France (1 non-Test matches).

Club career
Grundy was transferred from St. Helens to Barrow for a fee of £1,000 in August 1950 (based on increases in average earnings, this would be approximately £81,710 in 2013).

Challenge Cup Final appearances
Grundy played left-, i.e. number 11, in Barrow's 0–10 defeat by Wigan in the 1951 Challenge Cup Final during the 1950–51 season at Wembley Stadium, London on Saturday 5 May 1951, played left-, and was voted man of the match winning the Lance Todd Trophy in the 21–12 victory over Workington Town in the 1955 Challenge Cup Final during the 1954–55 season at Wembley Stadium, London on Saturday 30 April 1955, in front of a crowd of 66,513, and played in the 7–9 defeat by Leeds in the 1957 Challenge Cup Final during the 1956–57 season at Wembley Stadium, London on Saturday 11 May 1957, in front of a crowd of 76,318.

County Cup Final appearances
Grundy played in Barrow's 12–2 victory over Oldham in the 1954 Lancashire Cup Final during the 1954–55 season at Station Road, Swinton, on Saturday 23 October 1954.

Career records
Grundy is tenth in Barrow's all time try scorers list with 112-tries.

Genealogical information
Jack Grundy was the son of the rugby league forward of the 1920s for Lancashire and St. Helens Recs; Harry Grundy, and the brother of the rugby league footballer for St.Helens Recs and Liverpool Stanley, and the Secretary of Huyton RLFC; Kenneth Grundy.

References

External links
!Great Britain Statistics at englandrl.co.uk (statistics currently missing due to not having appeared for both Great Britain, and England)*(archived by web.archive.org) Back on the Wembley trail
Profile at saints.org.uk
(archived by web.archive.org) Barrow RL’s great Britons
(archived by web.archive.org) Profile at barrowrlfc.com
(archived by web.archive.org) Trio Inducted Into Barrow RL Hall Of Fame

1926 births
1978 deaths
20th-century Royal Navy personnel
Barrow Raiders players
English rugby league players
Great Britain national rugby league team players
Lancashire rugby league team players
Lance Todd Trophy winners
Rugby league second-rows
Rugby league players from St Helens, Merseyside
St Helens R.F.C. players